Dalla jelskyi is a species of butterfly in the family Hesperiidae. It is found in Peru and Rio de Janeiro, Brazil.

Subspecies
Dalla jelskyi jelskyi - Peru
Dalla jelskyi aurosa J. Zikán, 1938 - Rio de Janeiro, Brazil

References

Butterflies described in 1875
jelskyi
Hesperiidae of South America